The 2016 United States presidential election in New York was held on Tuesday, November 8, 2016, as part of the 2016 United States presidential election in which all 50 states plus the District of Columbia participated. New York voters chose electors to represent them in the Electoral College via a popular vote, pitting the Republican Party's nominee, businessman Donald Trump, and running mate Indiana Governor Mike Pence against Democratic Party nominee, former Secretary of State Hillary Clinton, and her running mate Virginia Senator Tim Kaine. New York has 29 electoral votes in the Electoral College.

New York remained a blue state, with Clinton winning with 59.01% of the vote, while Trump received 36.52% of the vote, a 22.49% Democratic margin of victory. However, Trump won more counties, taking 45 counties statewide compared to Clinton's 17. Trump also flipped 19 counties that had voted for Barack Obama in 2012, tied with Minnesota for the third-most counties flipped in any state; only Iowa and Wisconsin had more. Clinton received a smaller vote share than outgoing President Barack Obama had in 2012, while Trump improved on Mitt Romney's performance despite losing the state by a large margin.

New York was the home state of both major party nominees, though Clinton was born and raised in Chicago. Trump was born and raised in New York City and has been long associated with the state. Clinton has been a resident of Chappaqua in suburban Westchester County since 1999 and represented the state in the U.S. Senate from 2001 to 2009. Trump became the second consecutive major-party presidential nominee to lose his home state by over 20 points, after Mitt Romney, who lost his home state of Massachusetts by a similar margin in 2012. Before Romney, the last nominee this happened to was Herbert Hoover in his home state of California during 1932. Trump also became the fourth winning presidential candidate to lose his state of residence, after James K. Polk, Woodrow Wilson, and Richard Nixon.

The election also marks the most recent cycle in which Trump would be on the presidential ballot as a legal resident of New York state; according to court filings, he registered Palm Beach, Florida, as his "primary residence" in 2019. He thus became the first major presidential candidate since Nixon to have New York as his state of residence during his first presidential nomination but register another home state for his next presidential bid.

Trump is also the first Republican presidential candidate to win the White House without carrying Dutchess County since Ulysses S. Grant in 1872. This is also the first time since 1988 in which New York did not vote for the same candidate as neighboring Pennsylvania. As of the 2020 presidential election, this is the last time a major candidate lost their home state, as Trump changed his home state to Florida for the 2020 election, while Joe Biden would also go on to safely carry his home state of Delaware in 2020.

Primary elections

On April 19, 2016, in the presidential primaries, New York voters expressed their preferences for the Democratic and Republican parties' respective nominees for president. Registered members of each party only voted in their party's primary, while voters who were unaffiliated with either party didn't vote in the primary.

Democratic primary

Two candidates appeared on the Democratic presidential primary ballot:
 Hillary Clinton
 Bernie Sanders

Similarly to the general election, both candidates in the Democratic primary had a connection to New York, as New York was Clinton's adopted home state and the birthplace of Sanders (who was running from Vermont).

New York City results

Republican primary

Three candidates appeared on the Republican presidential primary ballot:
 Ted Cruz
 John Kasich
 Donald Trump

Republican primary results by county

*Note: Blank, Void, and Scattering (BVS) votes include some votes for Former Candidate Ben Carson. Carson vote totals are unavailable in some county canvass returns. Only those available are posted. New York is a Closed primary state, meaning that the turnout is based on Active Republican Voters on April 1, 2016

Results by congressional district

New York City results

General election

Predictions

Polling

Polls projected New York to remain safely in the Democratic column for former Senator Hillary Clinton, despite it also being the home state of Donald Trump for his entire life. The last poll showed Hillary Clinton leading Trump 51% to 34%, and the average of the final 3 polls statewide showed Clinton leading Trump 52% to 31%, which was accurate compared to the results.

Debate
The first Presidential Debate took place at Hofstra University. Snap polls indicated that Clinton won.

Candidates
New York is a fusion state, which means that candidates are allowed to be on multiple lines.
Those on the ballot were:

Democratic, Women's Equality and Working Families Parties
 Hillary Clinton / Tim Kaine

Conservative and Republican parties
 Donald Trump / Mike Pence

Green party
 Jill Stein / Ajamu Baraka

Independence and Libertarian parties
 Gary Johnson / Bill Weld

Gary Johnson and Bill Weld were nominated by the Libertarian and Independence Parties using separate elector slates. Their votes have been added together in the below table for convenience.

With the introduction of computerized voting, write-in candidates were permitted. 
The following is a certified list of persons who made valid presidential write in filings with the State Board of Elections

According to The New York Times, only 300 write-in votes were counted in 2012, while 63,239 were recorded as "Blank, Void or Scattering".

Results

Results by county

Counties that flipped from Democratic to Republican 
 Orange (County Seat: Goshen)
 Saratoga (County Seat: Ballston Spa)
 Cayuga (County Seat: Auburn)
 Cortland (County Seat: Cortland)
 Essex (County Seat: Elizabethtown)
 Otsego (County Seat: Cooperstown)
 Seneca (County Seat: Waterloo)
 Sullivan (County Seat: Monticello)
 Oswego (County Seat: Waterloo)
 Washington (County Seat: Hudson Falls)
 Broome (County Seat: Binghamton)
 Franklin (County Seat: Malone)
 Madison (County Seat: Wampsville)
 Niagara (County Seat: Lockport)
 Rensselaer (County Seat: Troy)
 Richmond (coterminous with Staten Island, a borough of New York City)
 St. Lawrence (County Seat: Canton)
 Suffolk (County Seat: Riverhead)
 Warren (County Seat: Queensbury

By congressional district
Clinton won 18 of 27 congressional districts. Both Trump and Clinton won a district held by the other party.

Analysis
Reflecting a strong nationwide trend of rural areas swinging hard against Clinton, Trump improved greatly upon recent Republican performances in rural Upstate New York. Upstate New York was historically a staunchly Republican region, although it had been trending Democratic since the 1990s, and Democrat Barack Obama had twice performed very strongly across both urban and rural upstate in the preceding two elections. Trump won 19 counties in New York State that voted for President Obama in 2012, 17 of which were rural upstate counties. Clinton did win Upstate New York's traditionally Democratic cities and hold onto the urban counties upstate. However, Trump also made gains in urban parts of upstate, which had long been in economic decline, due to his strength in economically distressed areas and his appeal to working-class whites who traditionally vote Democratic. Trump's message on trade policy and pledge to halt job outsourcing appealed strongly to the Rust Belt region of the United States, where many local economies had been ravaged by loss of industrial jobs, which extends into Upstate New York cities like Buffalo, Rochester, and Syracuse. 

In Erie County, where Buffalo is located in Western New York bordering the Great Lakes, Clinton won only 51-44 compared with Obama's 57–41 victory in 2012. Clinton suffered her strongest swings against her in traditionally Democratic Northern New York along the Saint Lawrence River, becoming the first Democrat to lose Franklin County and St. Lawrence County since 1988. Trump won St. Lawrence County 51-42, where Obama had won 57–41, and Franklin County 48-43, where Obama had won 62–36. Clinton barely held onto neighboring Clinton County 47-45, which Obama had also won 62–36. She additionally lost Broome and Niagara counties in the Upstate for the first time since 1984. Rensselaer County where the city of Troy is located voted Republican for the first time since 1988 as well. Trump is also the first Republican presidential candidate since George H. W. Bush in 1992 to carry Suffolk County,
  
The only upstate county where Clinton won by a stronger margin than Obama had in 2012 was the liberal Democratic stronghold of Tompkins County, home to the college town of Ithaca where Cornell University is located. Clinton and Obama both received 68% in the county, but Trump's unpopularity with young people and students led him to fall to only 24% of the vote compared with 28% for Romney. Hillary Clinton's landslide statewide win was powered by an overwhelmingly lopsided victory in the massively populated five boroughs of New York City, the largest city in the United States, despite Donald Trump's longtime popular cultural association with the city. In New York City, Hillary Clinton received 2,164,575 votes (79.0% of the vote) compared with only 494,549 votes (18.0% of the vote) for Donald Trump. This represented a slight fall from Barack Obama's historic 81.2% in the city in 2012, and the borough of Staten Island flipped from Obama to Trump. However, Trump's percentage was virtually unchanged from Romney's 17.8%. With huge victories in the other four boroughs, Clinton's 60.9% victory margin over Trump was a slight decrease from Obama's record 63.4% margin over Romney, making Clinton's win the second-widest victory margin for a presidential candidate in New York City history.

Trump's birthplace borough of Queens gave Clinton over 75% of the vote and less than 22% to Trump. In Manhattan, home to Trump Tower, Trump's famous landmark residence, Clinton received nearly 87% while Trump received less than 10% of the vote, the worst performance ever for a major party presidential candidate in Manhattan. This made Trump's home borough one of only 3 counties in the state where Trump did worse than Mitt Romney had in 2012, along with Westchester and Tompkins counties. 

In the populous suburbs around New York City, Hillary Clinton won overall, although, with the sole exception of her county of residence, there were strong swings against her compared with President Obama's performance. The downstate suburban counties around the city were historically Republican bastions, until Hillary's husband Bill Clinton made dramatic suburban gains for Democrats in the 1990s and easily swept every suburban New York county in his 1996 re-election campaign. North of the city, Clinton significantly further improved on Barack Obama's landslide margin in wealthy Westchester County, where the Clintons own their primary residence in Chappaqua, New York. Clinton won Westchester County 65-31 compared with Obama's 62–37 victory over Mitt Romney. Conversely, Trump made major gains on Long Island, as Clinton won Nassau County by only a slightly reduced 6-point margin rather than the 8-point margin by which Obama had won it. However, Suffolk County swung heavily to Trump, from a 51–47 win for Obama to a 51–45 win for Trump, the first time a Republican won Suffolk County since Bill Clinton narrowly lost it to George H. W. Bush by 1.5% in 1992.

While heavily Democratic New York City had secured consistent Democratic landslides in New York State for 3 decades, since 1992 every Democratic presidential candidate would have still carried New York State even without the massive Democratic vote margins provided by the 5 boroughs, albeit by substantially closer margins. In 2012, Obama won New York State outside of New York City with 54.03% of the vote compared with Mitt Romney's 44.54%. With Donald Trump having made major gains over Romney's performance across Upstate New York and improving overall in suburban downstate, Hillary Clinton was heavily dependent on New York City for her victory; her margin of 1,724,416 votes in the Five Boroughs accounted for almost all of her statewide majority. Clinton did manage to continue the Democratic winning streak in New York State outside of New York City, albeit just barely. Removing the 5 boroughs of New York City from the result, Clinton received 2,391,543 votes while Trump received 2,324,984 votes, meaning Clinton would have won New York State without the city by 66,559 votes, a margin of 1.41% out of all statewide votes cast outside of the city. The 2016 United States Senate election in New York held on the same day turned notably different. While Clinton only carried 12 upstate counties, Chuck Schumer won all counties in New York state except 5 and captured over 70% of the vote.

See also
 United States presidential elections in New York
 Presidency of Donald Trump
 2016 Democratic Party presidential debates and forums
 2016 Democratic Party presidential primaries
 2016 Republican Party presidential debates and forums
 2016 Republican Party presidential primaries

References

External links
 RNC 2016 Republican Nominating Process 
 Green papers for 2016 primaries, caucuses, and conventions

Presidential
New York
2016